The cuticle forms the major part of the integument of animals in the phylum Arthropoda. It includes most of the material of the exoskeleton of the insects, Crustacea, Arachnida, and Myriapoda.

Morphology

In arthropods, the integument, the external "skin", or "shell", is the product of a single layer of ectodermal epithelium. That layer is attached to the external or distal surface of the deepest layer, the non-cellular internal membrane of the integument. That non-cellular membrane is called the basement membrane. The layer of epithelium on the basement membrane produces the cuticle, which begins as a tough, flexible layer of chitin. Such thin, flexible chitin is the major structural part of the integument where flexibility is necessary, such as in bodily parts that must stretch to contain accumulated liquids, or that form joints between rigid parts of the exoskeleton. In other parts of the cuticle the function of the integument demands more rigid materials, such as armoured regions or the biting parts of the jaws, or where the exoskeleton forms the tubular limbs of most Arthropoda. To achieve such rigidity the outer chitin layer of the cuticle is impregnated, thickened, and reinforced with harder, more brittle materials such as sclerotised proteins or calcite. This main chitinous layer of the cuticle is called the procuticle.

The procuticle in most land Arthropoda, particularly insects, is covered externally with a thin, waxy, water-resistant outer layer containing no chitin. That outer layer is the epicuticle, and it is much thinner than the procuticle.  The chitinous procuticle is formed of an outer exocuticle and the inner endocuticle, and between the exocuticle and endocuticle there may be another layer called mesocuticle which has distinctive staining properties. The tough and flexible endocuticle is a laminated structure of layers of interwoven fibrous chitin and protein molecules, while the exocuticle is the layer in which any major thickening, armouring and biomineralization occurs. Biomineralization with calcite is particularly common in Crustacea, whereas sclerotization particularly occurs in insects. The exocuticle is greatly reduced in many soft-bodied insects, especially in the larval stages such as caterpillars and the larvae of parasitoidal Hymenoptera.

Hardened plates in the exoskeleton are called sclerites. Sclerites may be simple protective armour, but also may form mechanical components of the exoskeleton, such as in the legs, joints, fins or wings. In the typical body segment of an insect or many other Arthropoda, there are four principal regions. The dorsal region is the tergum; if the tergum bears any sclerites, those are called tergites. The ventral region is called the sternum, which commonly bears sternites. The two lateral regions are called the pleura (singular pleurum) and any sclerites they bear are called pleurites.

Within entomology, the term glabrous is used to refer to those parts of an insect's body lacking in setae (bristles) or scales.

Chemical composition
Chemically, chitin is a long-chain polymer of a N-acetylglucosamine, which is a derivative of glucose. The polymer bonds between the glucose units are  β(1→4) links, the same as in cellulose.

In its unmodified form, chitin is translucent, pliable, resilient and tough. In arthropods and other organisms however, it generally is a component of a complex matrix of materials. It practically always is associated with protein molecules that often are in a more or less sclerotised state, stiffened or hardened by cross-linking and by linkage to other molecules in the matrix. In some groups of animals, most conspicuously the Crustacea, the matrix is greatly enriched with, or even dominated by, hard minerals, usually calcite or similar carbonates that form much of the exoskeleton. In some organisms the mineral content may exceed 95%. The role of the chitin and proteins in such structures is more than just holding the crystals together; the crystal structure itself is so affected as to prevent the propagation of cracks under stress, leading to remarkable strength. The process of formation of such mineral-rich matrices is called biomineralization.

The difference between the unmodified and modified forms of chitinous arthropodan exoskeletons can be seen by comparing the body wall of say a bee larva, in which modification is minimal, to any armoured species of beetle, or the fangs of a spider. In both those examples there is heavy modification by sclerotisation. Again, contrasting strongly with both unmodified organic material such as largely pure chitin, and with sclerotised chitin and proteins, consider the integument of a heavily armoured crab, in which there is a very high degree of modification by biomineralization.

Moulting

As mentioned, the integument, and in particular the cuticle, is the product of the single layer of columnar or cuboidal epithelial cells attached to the basement membrane. The cuticle provides muscular support and acts as a protective shield as the insect develops, but it is not in itself cellular, so once established it cannot grow and offers little scope for maintenance, renewal or increase in size as the animal grows. Therefore, the animal periodically sheds the external part of the cuticle in a process called moulting or ecdysis. As the time for moulting approaches, as much as possible of the exocuticle material is internally digested by enzymatic action and reabsorbed through the epithelial layer. As its base gets dissolved away, the old cuticle begins to separate from the epidermis in a process called apolysis.

Early in the process of apolysis the epithelial cells release enzymatic moulting fluid between the old cuticle and the epidermis. The enzymes partly digest the endocuticle and the epidermis absorbs the digested material for the animal to assimilate. Much of that digested material is re-used to build the new cuticle. Once the new cuticle has formed sufficiently, the animal splits the remaining parts of the old integument along built-in lines of weakness and sheds them in the visible process of ecdysis, generally shedding and discarding the epicuticle and the reduced exocuticle, though some species carry them along for camouflage or protection. The shed portions are called the exuviae. The animal then expands its body by swallowing liquid or gas and in the process it stretches the new integument to its proper size and shape. The new integument still is soft and usually is pale, and it is said to be teneral or callow. It then undergoes a hardening and pigmentation process that might take anything from several minutes to several days, depending on the nature of the animal and the circumstances.

References

Cuticle